Otavi is a town of 4,000 inhabitants in the Otjozondjupa Region of central Namibia. Situated 360 km north of Windhoek, it is the district capital of the Otavi electoral constituency.

Geography 

The towns of Otavi, Tsumeb (to the north) and Grootfontein (to the northeast) define an area known as the "Otavi Triangle", also known as the Otavi Mountainland.  This geographical region is sometimes referred to as the "Golden Triangle", or as the "maize Triangle", owing to the cultivation of maize in the area. The three towns that define the triangle are roughly 60 km from each other.

Most of the area is dolomitic (Precambrian) and the district was in the past renowned for its mineral wealth. Most of the deposits have now been exhausted. Elefantenberg (elephant mountain), a mountain 1,624 meters above sea level, is located about 7 km south of Otavi.

Economy and infrastructure
Much of the town's economy relies on the two grocery stores, a mill, two banks, two gas stations, and many surrounding game/cattle farms, as well as a handful of other small business. The owners of most of these businesses are Afrikaners (white Africans or Boer, ultimately Dutch, heritage) or Germans.

Due to financial mismanagement, Otavi lost its town status in 2004 and was downgraded to "village". After revenue picked up again, town status was reinstated in November 2010. With the foundation of the Ohorongo Cement factory and a gold mine to be opened , business and employment is supposed to pick up significantly. A steel manufacturing plant it's also being developed. The project will cost $201 million and it's expected to produce 100,000 tons of steel.

Transport

Otavi is a railway junction where the line from Windhoek to Oshikango branches off the line to Grootfontein. The town is served by the Otavi railway station.

The B1, the main road going North and South through Namibia runs right through Otavi, about a 3½ hour drive from the capital, Windhoek.

History 

On July 1, 1915, the German Army was defeated at Otavi by South African troops; on June 9 they surrendered nearby and signed the Khorab Peace Treaty. A public monument to this event was erected in 1973 outside of Otavi.

During the South African Border War SWASpes, the 1 SWA Specialist Unit was based here, moving from Oshivelo in 1979. The unit consisted of horse mounted troops, dog trackers, human trackers and motorcycle units to hunt insurgents.

Politics
Otavi is governed by a town council that  has seven seats.

The 2015 local authority election was won by SWAPO which gained six seats and 957 votes. The remaining seat went to the Democratic Turnhalle Alliance (DTA) which gained 79 votes. SWAPO also won the 2020 local authority election. It obtained 1,092 votes and gained five seats. One seat each went to the Independent Patriots for Change (IPC, an opposition party formed in August 2020) and to the Landless People's Movement (LPM, an opposition party formed in 2016) with 260 and 167 votes, respectively.

Education

Previously the German Regierungsschule Otavi (Government School Otavi) was in the city.

See also 

 Transport in Namibia

References 

Towns in Namibia
Populated places in the Otjozondjupa Region